The 2014 WNBA Finals was the playoff series for the 2014 season of the Women's National Basketball Association (WNBA), and the conclusion of the season's playoffs. The Phoenix Mercury, champions of the Western Conference, faced the Chicago Sky, champions of the Eastern Conference.

The WNBA Finals were under a 2–2–1 rotation. The Mercury held home-court advantage as they had a better regular season record (29–5) than the Sky (15–19).  The Mercury swept the Sky in three games to win their third title in franchise history.

Background

2014 WNBA regular season

2014 WNBA Playoffs

Chicago Sky

The Chicago Sky finished 15–19, good for fourth place in the Eastern Conference. The Sky defeated the Atlanta Dream in three games, setting up a conference final against the Indiana Fever. Chicago lost the first game of the series, but rallied to win two straight to reach the finals for the first time in franchise history.

Phoenix Mercury

The Phoenix Mercury finished with the best record in the WNBA, finishing with a 29–5 record. The Mercury swept the fourth-seeded Los Angeles Sparks in the conference semifinals, and defeated the Minnesota Lynx in the Western Conference Finals in three games.

Regular-season series
The Phoenix Mercury won the season series 2–0:

Series summary
All times are in Eastern Daylight Time (UTC−4).

Game 1

Game 2

Game 3

Rosters

References

Finals
Women's National Basketball Association Finals
WNBA Finals
WNBA Finals
2010s in Chicago
Phoenix Mercury
Chicago Sky
Basketball competitions in Chicago
WNBA Finals
2010s in Phoenix, Arizona
Basketball competitions in Phoenix, Arizona